A low-flush toilet (or low-flow toilet or high-efficiency toilet) is a flush toilet that uses significantly less water than traditional high-flow toilets. Before the early 1990s in the United States, standard flush toilets typically required at least 3.5 gallons (13.2 litres) per flush and they used float valves that often leaked, increasing their total water use. In the early 1990s, because of concerns about water shortages, and because of improvements in toilet technology, some states and then the federal government began to develop water-efficiency standards for appliances, including toilets, mandating that new toilets use less water. The first standards required low-flow toilets of 1.6 gallons (6.0 litres) per flush. Further improvements in the technology to overcome concerns about the initial poor performance of early models have further cut the water use of toilets and while federal standards stagnate at 1.6 gallons per flush, certain states' standards toughened up to require that new toilets use no more than 1.28 gallons (4.8 litres) per flush, while working far better than older models.  Low-flush toilets include single-flush models and dual-flush toilets, which typically use 1.6 US gallons per flush for the full flush and 1.28 US gallons or less for a reduced flush.

Water savings 
The US Environmental Protection Agency's WaterSense program provides certification that toilets meet the goal of using less than 1.6 US gallons per flush. Units that meet or exceed this standard can carry the WaterSense sticker. The EPA estimates that the average US home will save US$90 per year, and $2,000 over the lifetime of the toilets. Dry toilets can lead to even more water savings in private homes as they use no water for flushing.

Problems 
The early low-flush toilets in the US often had a poor design that required more than one flush to rid the bowl of solid waste, resulting in limited water savings. In response, US Congressman Joe Knollenberg from Michigan tried to get Congress to repeal the law but was unsuccessful, and the industry worked to redesign and improve toilet functioning. Some reduction in sewer flows have caused slight backups or required redesign of wastewater pipes, but overall, very substantial residential water savings have resulted from the change over time to more efficient toilets.

History 
In 1988 Massachusetts became the first state in the US to mandate the use of low-flush toilets in new construction and remodeling. In 1992 US President George H. W. Bush signed the Energy Policy Act. This law made 1.6 gallons per flush a mandatory federal maximum for new toilets. This law went into effect on January 1, 1994 for residential buildings and January 1, 1997 for commercial buildings.

The first generation of low-flush toilets were simple modifications of traditional toilets. A valve would open and the water would passively flow into the bowl. The resulting water pressure was often inadequate to carry away waste. Improvements in design now make modern models not only more water-efficient but more effective than old models. In addition to tank-type toilets that "pull" waste down, there are also now pressure-assist models, which use water pressure to effectively "push" waste.

See also
Low-flow fixtures
Dual flush toilet
Sewer dosing unit
Waterless urinal
Residential water use in the US and Canada

References 

Toilets
Toilet types
Water conservation
Water conservation tools
Sustainable products
Bathrooms